Jennie Runk (born November 2, 1988) is an American plus-size model. She is best known for appearing in H&M's Summer 2013 beachwear campaign, which was featured on the front page of H&M's United States website in late April 2013.

Early life
Jennie Runk was born in Georgia and later moved to Chesterfield, Missouri. Runk became a Girl Scout at age 5.  As a teenager, she was involved with her high school drama program and worked as a Girl Scout leader. Her family rescued and fostered dogs. She volunteered for the cat adoption center for Open Door Animal Sanctuary at Petsmart in Chesterfield, Missouri.

Runk graduated from Parkway West High School in 2007. She graduated from Stephens College with a Bachelor of Fine Arts in creative writing in 2011.

Career
Runk was discovered in 2003 at 14 in a PetSmart in Chesterfield, Missouri by Mary Clarke of Mother Model Management while she was volunteering for the cat adoption department. At the time, she was a size 8, in between straight size and plus-size modeling. The Clarkes told her she needed to either lose weight or gain weight to model.

She has appeared on Good Morning America and was profiled by Cosmopolitan.

She initially signed with New York agency Wilhelmina Models in March 2004.  She later switched to Ford Models. Runk starting modeling full-time in 2011 after she moved to New York City. Her first major editorial was Body Language in US Vogues April 2005 Shape issue, which was photographed by Steven Meisel.

In addition she appeared twice in Glamour, most notably (in November 2009) nude with six other plus-size models including Ashley Graham, Crystal Renn and Lizzie Miller. Other editorials include Cosmo Girl in February 2006, Marie Claire in October 2007, and several Seventeen editorials. Runk was also interviewed by Vogue Italias Vogue Curvy.

Her beachwear appearance in H&M's Summer 2013 campaign was featured on the front page of H&M's US website in late April 2013 and received extensive media coverage and spread rapidly through blogs and social media. As a result of the coverage, Runk wrote an op-ed piece for BBC on size diversity in fashion and her experiences as a model in May 2013.

Runk has modeled for many plus size retailers, including two Marina Rinaldi campaigns in 2012. Jennie has also walked in several Elena Miro runway shows.

Personal life
Runk lives in New York City. She owns a one-eyed cat, Jasmine.

References

1989 births
American female models
Living people
Plus-size models
People from Georgia (U.S. state)
Stephens College alumni
People from St. Louis
21st-century American women